The 2020 St. George Illawarra Dragons season was the 22nd in the joint venture club's history. The Dragons' men's team competed in the NRL's 2020 Telstra Premiership season. The women's team, meanwhile will play their third season in the NRLW's 2020 Telstra Women's Premiership season. Both teams competed in the 2020 NRL Nines, with the men's side coming runners-up and the women's side winning the tournament.

On 13 August, Paul McGregor departed as the head coach of the men's team. Assistant coach Dean Young took over as the interim coach of the first team for the remainder of the season.

Squad

Gains and losses

Ladder

NRL Nines

Pool stage

Finals

NRL season

Ladder progression

Season results

NRL Nines

Pre-season trials

NRL season 

Notes

aMatches in rounds two, three and four were played behind closed doors due to the COVID-19 pandemic.

bAdam Gee was substituted after half time as referee in the round 18 game for Matt Cecchin after receiving a calf injury during the game.

Representative honours

References 

St. George Illawarra Dragons seasons
St. George Illawarra Dragons season
2020 NRL Women's season